Caundle Marsh is a village and civil parish in northwest Dorset, England, situated in the Blackmore Vale,  southeast of Sherborne. The parish includes the hamlet of Tut Hill and the Dorset County Council estimate that in 2013 the population of the parish was 70.

History
The parish was within the hundred of Sherborne until the disuse of the hundred in stages in the late 19th and early 20th centuries. The parish church of Saints Peter and Paul was completed in 1857.

References

External links 

Villages in Dorset